Børøyholmen Lighthouse is a lighthouse in the municipality of Hitra in Trøndelag county, Norway.  The lighthouse is located in the Trondheimsleia in the entrance to the Kråkvågfjorden on a tiny island off the shore of the village of Hestvika.  The light marks the channel into the Trondheimsleia between the island of Hitra and the islands of Leksa. 

The site is only accessible by boat.

History
The original lighthouse was built in 1874 and it was closed in 1970 when the new automated lighthouse was built alongside it. The house was demolished in 1973, but the tower remains.

See also

 List of lighthouses in Norway
 Lighthouses in Norway

References

External links
 Norsk Fyrhistorisk Forening 

Lighthouses completed in 1874
Lighthouses completed in 1970
Hitra
Lighthouses in Trøndelag